William Henry Whitaker (1821–1888) was an American Seminole War veteran and pioneer who, under the provisions of the Armed Occupation Act, established the first permanent settlement in what is now Sarasota, Florida. There he traded mullet with Cubans to bring the first groves of economically important oranges to the state. He later married Mary Jane Wyatt and with her raised Nancy Whitaker, the first child recorded in what now is the county of Sarasota and a family of eleven children. His father-in-law, William Wyatt, was a constitutional delegate who helped to originate, and signed, Florida's first constitution. At the end of the Civil War, he helped Judah P. Benjamin escape to London.

Early life
He was born in 1821 in Savannah, Georgia, to Frances Snell, the second wife of Richard Whitaker. At the age of twelve, he left home with ten dollars and a gold watch to St. Marks, Florida, then the primary seaport of Florida's west coast. He worked there in the fishing trade and in time crossed paths with his half-brother Hamlin Valentine Snell, who later became President of the Florida Senate, Speaker of the House and later, Tampa's eighth mayor. Living in Tallahassee, Snell committed William to a formal education, arranging lodging and board. It was in Tallahassee that he met his would-be wife Mary Jane Wyatt. In 1840, at age nineteen, Whitaker enlisted in Florida's Mounted Militia for three months to fight in the Second Seminole War, for which he was compensated $70. The occupation entry on his enlistment papers read "schoolboy". Whitaker served with his Regiment at Fort Macomb and other wartime camps where illness plagued him. As the war was concluding, Whitaker traveled Florida's Gulf Coast and to Havana, Cuba, working in the fishing trade.

Sarasota

Although the western coast of Florida had long been explored by the Spanish, few permanent settlements were established south of Gainesville. In December 1842, he and his half-brother sailed to what is now Yellow Bluffs overlooking Sarasota Bay; the high ground, the freshwater springs, and evidence of burial mounds proved the land would be ideal for a home. There he built a simple log cabin and began fishing and farming. For a penny per fish, he traded with traveling Cubans, saving enough money to travel to Dade City to purchase cattle. It was from the same Cuban traders that he secured oranges and guavas, planting the first commercial citrus groves in the state. Florida now provides 75% of the country's oranges. William experimented with grafting oranges, dubbing his the "Whitaker Sweet".

During this period he was active in civic duty, serving as the clerk of elections for the 5th Precinct of then Hillsborough County where all of six voters were registered. Later, he was elected to be county sheriff. He purchased his cattle in 1847, two years after Florida achieved statehood, Whitaker took "47" as his brand to mark the date of his venture. He weathered the '46 hurricane and the Great Gale of 1848 in his cedar log house, calling the latter "the granddaddy of all hurricanes." The hurricane ripped a path through Longboat Key creating a new pass, lazily named by Whitaker "New Pass", a name it still retains. In 1851 he married his sweetheart, Mary Jane Wyatt, a pioneer resident of Manatee (a village settlement along the river of that name about thirteen miles to the northeast) and the daughter of Col. William Wyatt. She moved to the cabin to begin a frontier family. Their marriage and their first child, Nancy Catherine Stuart Whitaker, were the first of each recorded in what now are the records of Sarasota County. In that same year, with land warrant number 56934, he purchased  from the state, buying at the same time an additional  for $1.25 each. In modern-day Sarasota, this land stretches from Indian Beach Drive south to Tenth Street, which Whitaker called Azarti Acres. The path he struck from Yellow Bluffs northward would become part of Tamiami Trail in 1926.

Seminole Indians

The Whitakers were sympathetic to the local Indians and escaped slaves, in one case ferrying the fabled Seminole chief Billy Bowlegs across the river to their home where they brought him back to health from malaria. When Whitaker's wife asked the chief if he would kill her in times of aggression, Bowlegs assured her that if he did, he would do so quickly. That fragile relationship soured in early 1856 when Bowlegs became angered at the destruction of his gardens by United States troops. Soon after, the Indians attacked Braden Castle, and hostilities increased. Whitaker, securing his family at the fort in what now is Manatee County, headed seventy miles to Peace Creek, the closest military detachment to convey the news of the attack. Not long afterward, the Whitaker home in Sarasota was burned to the ground with a friend inside, George Owen, and the destruction of many more homes followed. The Billy Bowlegs War lasted until 1858.

Civil War
After rebuilding, the Whitakers were largely uninvolved with the raging American Civil War, despite Florida being the third state to secede from the Union. The Union push to destroy Confederate blockades succeeded in restricting goods to the frontier settlers, and union excursions inland from the Gulf of Mexico became more frequent. The blockade forced Whitaker to take the difficult three to four-week journey to Gainesville to buy grain for community use. Whitaker was one of three locals who had gristmills hidden deep in the woods. These became important to the community after Union troops destroyed the steam-operated one.

As the war was nearing an end, Judah P. Benjamin, Secretary of State to the Confederacy, was being pursued through the Southern states. Making his way to Florida's west coast, John Lesley of Tampa escorted him by boat to the Sarasota area. Whitaker, neighbor Captain John Tresca, and Benjamin made plans for securing a boat to be used in the secretary's escape. Though most boats had been destroyed or confiscated during the war, after two weeks a yawl was secured and stocked. Benjamin pushed off from Whitaker Bayou, making it to Bimini, safe from Union reach, and later to Nassau. From there he made it to London where he went on to serve in the Queen's Counsel.

Later life

William Whitaker restricted himself to the homestead in his later years. His wife had borne eleven children, nine of whom survived. After a long life on the frontier, he died in 1888 at age 67 from injuries related to a fall from his horse. Mary Jane died in 1909. He and many of his descendants rest in the Whitaker Cemetery on 12th Street adjacent to Pioneer Park. The cemetery, surrounded by an Italian Renaissance balustrade, was given a marker (above), dedicated by the Daughters of the American Revolution, honoring the family's local history.

Nearly all of Whitaker's estate has been replaced by offices, homes and condominiums along the Sarasota coast. The inlet running through his family's homestead is still named Whitaker Bayou, and Whitaker Gateway Park exists in their honor.

References

External links
Sarasota Historical Resources
Sarasota County History Center
Sarasota County History Center timeline
Sarasota History Alive

1821 births
1888 deaths
People of Florida in the American Civil War
American people of the Seminole Wars
Florida pioneers
Florida sheriffs
People from Sarasota, Florida
People from Hillsborough County, Florida
People from Savannah, Georgia
Deaths by horse-riding accident in the United States
Accidental deaths in Florida